The 1933 UCI Track Cycling World Championships were the World Championship for track cycling. They took place in Paris, France from 11 to 15 August 1933. Three events for men were contested, two for professionals and one for amateurs.

Medal summary

Medal table

See also
 1933 UCI Road World Championships

References

Track cycling
UCI Track Cycling World Championships by year
Uci
1933 in track cycling
International cycle races hosted by France